The Civil Jurisdiction and Judgments Act 1982 (c.27) is an Act of the Parliament of the United Kingdom, which was passed to implement the Brussels Convention of 1968 into British law. As well as governing whether the Courts of England and Wales, Northern Ireland and Scotland have jurisdiction to hear cases against defendants in other contracting states, the Act provided a statutory basis for the division of jurisdiction between the three jurisdictions within the UK. No provision was made in 1982 for division of jurisdiction between the UK and Gibraltar; this was rectified by the Civil Jurisdiction and Judgments Act 1982 (Gibraltar) Order 1997 which stated that, for the purposes of the 1982 Act, Gibraltar should be treated as a separate contracting state.

A further significant amendment was made to the Act by the Civil Jurisdiction and Judgments Act 1991 which gave Courts power under the Lugano convention, and later by the Civil Jurisdiction and Judgments Order 2001 which gave Courts jurisdiction under Council Regulation (EC) 44/2001 (commonly known as the Judgments Regulation or the Brussels Regulation). The latter applies to all 27 current member states of the European Union.

Contracting states in 1982
The contracting states to the Brussels Convention in 1982 were the then members of the European Economic Community (now the European Union). These were Belgium, Denmark, France, (West) Germany, Greece, Republic of Ireland, Italy, Luxembourg and the Netherlands.

See also 
 Civil Jurisdiction and Judgments Act 1991
 Civil Procedure Rules 1998

Bibliography

External links
Discussion of Act by a committee of the UK Parliament
Civil Jurisdiction and Judgments Act 1982 (Gibraltar) Order 1997
Civil Jurisdiction and Judgments Order 2001

United Kingdom Acts of Parliament 1982
Conflict of laws